Gaza Weekly Newspaper is a weekly newspaper established in 1950, and published from the city of Gaza. The first issue was on 6 July 1951. The newspaper is printed in the Zeitoun neighbourhood in Gaza City. It has been dealing with local issues and is distributed in Jordan, Saudi Arabia and Egypt.

References 

Newspapers published in the State of Palestine
Weekly newspapers
Publications established in 1950
Mass media in Gaza City
Establishments in All-Palestine (Gaza)
Defunct newspapers
1950 establishments in Asia